The Aviastroitel AC-6 is a Russian mid-wing, single-seat FAI 15 Metre Class glider that was designed and manufactured by Aviastroitel, now Glider Air Craft.

The aircraft was originally conceived as a retractable engine motor glider, to be a competitor to the Albastar Apis, but instead it was put into production as a conventional unpowered glider.

Design and development
The company states the design goal of the AC-6 as a glider for the competition and training roles, even though it does not have provisions for water ballast.

The AC-6 is a  wing span development of the  span AC-5M, with longer, higher aspect ratio wings terminating in winglets. Like the AC-5, the AC-6 wing employs a Wortmann FX 60-157 airfoil. Assembly of the wing to the fuselage uses a cam pin and incorporates automatic hookups for the ailerons and air brakes. The landing gear is a retractable  tire monowheel gear suspended with a pneumatic-hydraulic shock absorber. The wheel has a lever and cable operated drum brake. The canopy provides 300° field of view and is jettisonable.

A two-seat version was also proposed.

Specifications (AC-6)

See also

References

2000s Russian sailplanes